The women's heptathlon event at the 1994 Commonwealth Games was held at the Centennial Stadium in Victoria, British Columbia on 22 and 23 August.

Results

References

Day 1 results
Day 2 results

Heptathlon
1994
1994 in women's athletics